Richard James Howard (born 10 June 1943) is a retired professional soccer player who played as a goalkeeper. He moved to Canada from England in 1967 and went on to appear for Canada internationally.

After retiring from playing in 1974, he became an educator, long-time FIFA coaching instructor, coach, author, and a print and broadcast journalist on soccer in Canada and abroad. Howard was inducted into the Canadian Soccer Hall of Fame in 2002.

Playing career
Howard made one appearance for Chester in the English Football League Fourth Division during 1965–66. During this time, he received a diploma in physical education from the Chester College of Education in 1965. He moved to Canada and played for the Hamilton Primos of the National Soccer League in 1967, making it to the championship finals before losing to Windsor Teutonia. Later that year he played several matches for the Rochester Lancers in the American Soccer League before playing in the inaugural season of the North American Soccer League for the Detroit Cougars in 1968. When the team folded at the end of the season he returned to Rochester who was playing in the American Soccer League at the time. 

The Lancers joined the NASL in 1970 and he was a member of the team that won the championship that year. Howard graduated from the nearby State University of New York at Brockport with a degree in physical education. He was acquired from the Lancers by the Toronto Metros in 1971 and played in Toronto through the 1974 season. He was also a member of the Canadian national team during 1974 FIFA World Cup qualification. In 1977, he was named to the Rochester Lancers Team of the Decade.

Post-playing career
From 1972 to 1986 he was Director of Athletics and Head of Physical Education at Crescent School, a private school in Toronto. During this time he served on the coaching staff of Canadian national youth teams and in 1981 was assistant coach of the World Cup team for 1982 FIFA World Cup qualification, as the team came within one goal of qualifying for the 1982 World Cup. Howard was appointed Technical Director of the Canadian Soccer Association from 1986 to 1992 and also served as Canada's first National Goalkeeping Coach. He attained a unique treble in 1986 as the first person in Canadian soccer to have played, managed and coached in the national program. In 1987, he was appointed by FIFA to conduct a coaching course in Kuwait and since that time has conducted more than 100 FIFA courses and projects around the world as the longest-serving FIFA coaching instructor in North America. In addition Howard was a member of the FIFA Technical and Development Committee from 1998 until 2012 and served as Chairman of the CONCACAF Coaching Committee from 2001 until 2012.

An author of two books on the game "Shutouts and saves", a goalkeeping manual, and "Soccer - Diving headers, selling a dummy, and everything else about the game" with noted artist Ben Wicks. This in addition to producing numerous coaching manuals and video tapes for the Canadian Soccer Association, CONCACAF and FIFA. He also wrote a weekly soccer column for the Toronto Sun newspaper from 1994 to 1998.

Howard has had an extensive career as a soccer media analyst. It all began in the 1980s when Howard and Mike Povey were hired as 
hosts for the popular series "Road to Wembley" on CFMT-TV. He also hosted and produced "The CSA Report" which featured the Soccer 2000 series as well as the Classic Cup Final series on ESPN Classic Canada. Howard was the in-studio analyst for every World Cup from 1990 until 2010 and worked for CBC Radio Sports in Brazil 2014. He was the on-location or in-studio analyst for EURO Finals from 1996 until 2008. In addition he has been a color commentator for over 200 games on CBC, CTV, ROGERS SPORTSNET, TSN, CFMT/OMNI, and the FOX SOCCER CHANNEL. He currently is the international reporter for the longest running radio show in North America "Soccer is a kick in the grass" on WYSL in Rochester New York and recently completed a five-year soccer project as Director of Soccer at Crescent School from 2009 to 2014.

Howard was inducted into the Canadian Soccer Hall of Fame in 2002 as a builder and the Rochester Lancers Wall of Fame in 2013.

References

External links
 / Canada Soccer Hall of Fame
 NASL stats
 Dick Howard stats

1943 births
Living people
Alumni of the University of Chester
Canadian soccer commentators
Canadian columnists
Canadian educators
Canadian expatriate sportspeople in the United States
Canadian expatriate soccer players
Canada men's international soccer players
Canadian soccer coaches
Canada Soccer Hall of Fame inductees
Canadian soccer players
Canadian sports announcers
Canadian sports builders
Canadian sportswriters
Detroit Cougars (soccer) players
English expatriate footballers
English footballers
English emigrants to Canada
Expatriate soccer players in Canada
Expatriate soccer players in the United States
Association football goalkeepers
Naturalized citizens of Canada
American Soccer League (1933–1983) players
North American Soccer League (1968–1984) players
People from Bromborough
Soccer players from Toronto
Rochester Lancers (1967–1980) players
Canadian sports journalists
English Football League players
Toronto Blizzard (1971–1984) players
Chester City F.C. players
Canadian National Soccer League players
Canadian expatriate sportspeople in England
English expatriate sportspeople in the United States
English expatriate sportspeople in Canada
Hamilton Steelers (ECPSL) players